Chernomorets Stadium is a multi-purpose stadium in Burgas, Bulgaria. It is used mostly for football matches and was the home ground of Chernomorets Burgas and Chernomorets 919. The stadium originally held 22,000 people and was supposed to be replaced with a new modern sports complex. On 23 February 2019, Chernomorets 1919 Burgas played the first official game on the stadium in more than a decade, after it had previously fallen into disrepair. The renovated central stand and visitors' sector currently hold a combined licensed capacity of 1,300 people.

References

Chernomorets Stadium
Multi-purpose stadiums in Bulgaria
Sports venues in Burgas